The Action Museum is a museum in Zhongli District, Taoyuan City, Taiwan. The museum is owned by Action Electronics Co., Ltd.

History
The museum exhibits electronic component progress and development used in Taiwan industries over the past 30 years.

Architecture
The museum spans over an area of 300 m2 and located at the ground floor of Action Electronics Co., Ltd. headquarter building.

Exhibitions
The museum is divided into five exhibition areas, such as historical area, historical exhibit area and product demonstration area.

Transportation
The museum is accessible east of Xingnan Station of Taoyuan Metro.

See also
 List of museums in Taiwan

References

Museums in Taoyuan City
Zhongli District